The 2008–09 Cypriot Fourth Division was the 24th season of the Cypriot fourth-level football league. Achyronas Liopetriou won their 3rd title.

Format
Fourteen teams participated in the 2008–09 Cypriot Fourth Division. All teams played against each other twice, once at their home and once away. The team with the most points at the end of the season crowned champions. The first three teams were promoted to the 2009–10 Cypriot Third Division and the last three teams were relegated to regional leagues.

Point system
Teams received three points for a win, one point for a draw and zero points for a loss.

Changes from previous season
Teams promoted to 2008–09 Cypriot Third Division
 Digenis Oroklinis
 Othellos Athienou
 Orfeas Nicosia

Teams relegated from 2007–08 Cypriot Third Division
 Anagennisi Germasogeias
 ENAD Polis Chrysochous
 Iraklis Gerolakkou

Teams promoted from regional leagues
 Konstantios & Evripidis Trachoniou
 Nikos & Sokratis Erimis
 Dafni Troulloi

Teams relegated to regional leagues
 Ethnikos Latsion FC
 SEK Agiou Athanasiou
 FC Episkopi

League standings

Results

See also
 Cypriot Fourth Division
 2008–09 Cypriot First Division
 2008–09 Cypriot Cup for lower divisions

Sources
 

Cypriot Fourth Division seasons
Cyprus
2008–09 in Cypriot football